Il corpo dell'anima (The body of the soul) is a 1999 Italian erotic drama film directed by Salvatore Piscicelli.

Cast 
Roberto Herlitzka: Ernesto
Raffaella Ponzo: Luana
Ennio Fantastichini: Mauro
Gianluigi Pizzetti: Sandro

References

External links

1999 films
Italian erotic drama films
Films directed by Salvatore Piscicelli
1990s erotic drama films
1999 drama films
1990s Italian-language films
1990s Italian films